Lin Shu-fen (born 17 January 1973) is a member of the Democratic Progressive Party who is in the Legislative Yuan in Taiwan.

Early life
Lin obtained her bachelor's degree in social development from Shih Hsin University.

Political careers

2016 legislative election

References

1973 births
Living people
Democratic Progressive Party Members of the Legislative Yuan
Politicians of the Republic of China on Taiwan from Changhua County
Members of the 7th Legislative Yuan
Members of the 8th Legislative Yuan
Members of the 9th Legislative Yuan
Members of the 10th Legislative Yuan